Gaijin 2: Love Me As I Am is a 2005 Brazilian drama film directed by Tizuka Yamasaki. It is the sequel of Gaijin: Roads to Freedom (1980), also directed by Yamasaki.

The film is set in 1908 and tells the story of Japanese immigrants who come to work on a coffee plantation in Brazil. There, they will need to adapt to the conditions and exploitations of the farm owners. The film was shot in a scenographic city in Londrina, and in locations of Curitiba, Maringá, Foz do Iguaçu, Paranaguá, and Cambará.

Plot 
In 1908 Titoe (Kyoko Tsukamoto) arrives in Brazil, a Japanese coming to the country in attempt to get money from work and then return to Japan to be able to follow her life in the home country. In 1935, now with her daughter Shinobu (Nobu McCarthy, who died in 2002 during filming) born and without enough money to return to Japan, Titoe decides to buy her first plot of land in Londrina.

The Second World War, and its consequences for Japan end up further delaying Titoe's plans to return to the country, especially after Kazumi and Maria (Tamlyn Tomita), her grandchildren were born. Maria marries Gabriel (Jorge Perrugoría), son of a Spanish father and Italian mother, with whom he has two children: Yoko (Lissa Diniz) and Pedro.

The business of Gabriel is going well, until the seizure made by the Collor Government in 1990 leads to bankruptcy. Without alternatives, Maria and the children will live with Titoe while Gabriel embarks to Kobe, intending to work temporarily and raise money for the family.

Cast 
Tamlyn Tomita as Maria Yamashita
Jorge Perugorría as Gabriel Damazo Bravo Salinas
Nobu McCarthy as Shinobu Yamashita
Eda Nagayama as Shinobu Yamashita (young)
Aya Ono as Titoe Yamashita (née Yamada)
Kyoko Tsukamoto as Titoe Yamada (young)
Kissei Kumamoto as Mr. Yamashita / Kazumi
Luís Melo as Ramon Salina Bravo Salinas
Zezé Polessa as Gina
Louise Cardoso as Sofia Damazo Bravo Salinas
Mariana Ximenes as Weronica Müller
Lissa Diniz as Yoko Salinas
Carlos Takeshi as Vicente
Eijiro Ozaki as Kunihiro
Felipe Kannenberg as George Müller
Keniti Kaneko as Jiro Kobayashi
Ryogo Suguimoto as Ken
Dado Dolabella as Yoko's Friend

See also
Dirty Hearts

References

External links
 

2005 drama films
2005 films
2000s historical drama films
Brazilian historical drama films
Films about immigration
Films directed by Tizuka Yamasaki
Films set in 1908
Films shot in Curitiba
Films shot in Foz do Iguaçu
2000s Japanese-language films
2000s Portuguese-language films